Mrunal Jain (born 9 January 1985) is an Indian television and Bollywood film actor. He is best known for his role of Hiten, Sameer and Akash in the television series Bandini, Hitler Didi and Uttaran.

Career
He started his career with the role of Krishna in Kahaani Hamaaray Mahaabhaarat Ki. Later he appeared in Bandini as Hiten. He also acted in Hitler Didi as Sameer and Looteri Dulhan as Abhinav. He played the role of Akash Chatterjee in Uttaran opposite Tina Dutta. He was last seen playing the role of Raghav Patil in Bandhan as the lead opposite Chhavi Pandey.

Personal life

Mrunal was born on January 9, 1985, in Pindwara and brought up in Mumbai. He is from a Jain family. He married Sweety Jain, whom he was introduced by a common friend of his and Sweety's family. The marriage took place on 13 July 2013 in Mumbai.

Filmography

Television

Films

References

External links
 
 

21st-century Indian male actors
Male actors in Hindi cinema
Indian male television actors
Indian male soap opera actors
Male actors from Mumbai
Living people
1985 births